The 2003 Australian Nations Cup Championship was a CAMS sanctioned motor racing title for drivers of GT sports cars complying with Group 2E Nations Cup regulations. The championship, which was managed by Procar Australia as part of the 2003 Procar Championship Series, was the fourth Australian Nations Cup Championship. The title was won by Paul Stokell driving a Lamborghini Diablo GTR.

Calendar
The championship was contested over an eight-round series with three races per round.

Note: ** Race 3 at the Surfers Paradise round was cancelled due to a security issue.

Points system
Championship points were awarded on a 30-20-16-13-11-10-9-8-7-6-5-4-3-2-1 basis to the first 15 finishers in each race.
In addition, three points were awarded to the driver earning pole position.

Results

Manufacturers Trophy
The Manufacturers Trophy was awarded to the manufacturer which attained the highest number of cumulative points over all rounds, inclusive of pole position points. Points were awarded as per the drivers championship to the two highest scoring finishers from each marque in each race.

Notes and references

External links
 Image gallery

Australian Nations Cup Championship
Nations Cup Championship